George Albert Starbird (November 26, 1908 – November 11, 1994) was mayor of San Jose, California from 1954 to 1956 and served on its City Council before and after his term as mayor (1950 to 1962).

Starbird was born on November 26, 1908, in San Jose, California.  He attended Stanford University and graduated in 1932 with a degree in English.
He married Carolyn Hall Starbird, whom he met at Stanford, on February 22, 1934.  They had two sons, George Anthony Starbird and Timothy Starbird, and two daughters, Susan Irene Starbird and Carolyn Jane Starbird.  George Starbird died on November 11, 1994, in Milpitas, California.

Starbird was Mayor of San Jose during its peak growth period.  One of his accomplishments was the San José–Santa Clara Regional Wastewater Facility. 

Starbird wrote The New Metropolis, a book on San Jose history published in 1972. In the 1930s, he published more than a dozen mystery stories in pulp detective magazines such as Black Book Detective and Federal Agent; some stories appeared under his Val Masterson pseudonym.

References 

 Obituary: Starbird, George A., (ob) Locus v34:1 No.408 Jan 1995

Arbuckle, Clyde; Clyde Arbuckle's History of San Jose; 1985
Starbird, George; The New Metropolis; San Jose: The Rosecrucian Press; 1972.

External links 
Portrait of San Jose Mayor George Starbird, 1959

Mayors of San Jose, California
1908 births
1994 deaths
California city council members
Stanford University alumni
20th-century American politicians